ComicFesta is a digital comic platform operated by WWWave Corporation.

AnimeFesta 
In March 2017, ComicFesta added an anime streaming service called "Anime Zone" on their website. It was rebranded as "ComicFesta Anime" in February 2019, then as "AnimeFesta" in May 2021.

As well as existing anime, the platform also streams ecchi anime based on comics originally distributed by ComicFesta, such as "Sōryo to Majiwaru Shikiyoku no Yoru ni...". As these comics include TL comics, MENS comics, BL comics, or adult comics which feature mature content, the platform also produces and distributes an exclusive adult-rated "complete versions" of those anime.

Anime originally created by the platform are also aired on television channels and streamed by other internet platforms, but they would only provide either a "regular version" or an "R-15 version" with various degrees of censorship.

The platform also distributes motion comic versions of other series and TV Drama adaptions of other comics published by the platform's parent company.

All of the originally adapted anime on the platform are also available with English subtitles through Coolmic, WWWave's international digital comic distribution and anime streaming service.

List of the platform's originally adapted anime 

 Sōryo to Majiwaru Shikiyoku no Yoru ni... (April-June 2017)
 Skirt no Naka wa Kedamono Deshita. (July-September 2017)
 Omiai Aite Wa Oshiego, Tsuyokina, Mondaiji. (October-December 2017)
 25-sai no Joshikousei (January-March 2018)
 Amai Choubatsu: Watashi wa Kanshu Sen'you Pet (April-June 2018)
 Joshiochi!: 2-kai kara Onnanoko ga... Futtekita!? (July-September 2018)
 Shuudengo, Capsule Hotel de, Joushi ni Binetsu Tsutawaru Yoru. (October-December 2018)
 Papa Datte, Shitai (January-March 2019)
 Araiya-san! Ore to Aitsu ga Onnayu de!? (April-June 2019)
 Fire in His Fingertips (July-September 2019)
 XL Joushi (October-November 2019)
 Overflow (January-February 2020)
 Ore no Yubi de Midarero.: Heitengo Futarikiri no Salon de... (April-May 2020)
 The Titan's Bride (July-August 2020)
 Ōkami-san wa Taberaretai (September 2020)
 Otona nya Koi no Shikata ga Wakaranee! (October-November 2020)
 JimiHen—!! ~Jimiko o Kaechaū Jun Isei Kōyū~ (January-March 2021)
 Kuro-Gyaru ni Natta Kara Shinyū to Yatte Mita (April-June 2021)
 Fire in His Fingertips 2 (July-August 2021)
 Maou Evelogia ni Mi o Sasage yo (October-December 2021)
 Showtime! ~Uta no Onee-san Datte Shitai~ (October-November 2021)
 Ouji no Honmei wa Akuyaku Reijou (January-March 2022)
 3-byougo, Yajuu.: Goukon de Sumi ni Ita Kare wa Midara Nikushoku deshita (April-June 2022)
 Mori no Kuma-san, Toumin-chuu. (July-September 2022)
 Harem Camp! (October 2022)
 Showtime! 2 ~Uta no Onee-san Datte Shitai~ (January 2023)
 Sazanami Souji ni Shojo wo Sasagu: Saa, Jikkuri Medemashou ka (2023)
 Fuufu Koukan: Otto Yori Sugoi Kongai Sex (TBA)

List of non-ComicFesta series 

 Land of the Lustrous

References

External links 

 ComicFesta's website
 ComicFesta's AnimeZone website
 
  
  (PR account)
 
 Coolmic's website

Manga hosting services
Pages with unreviewed translations